The Martyrdom of St Sebastian may refer to:

Saint Sebastian (c. 256–288), early Christian saint and martyr

Paintings of the subject
St. Sebastian (Mantegna), three different 15th-century paintings by Andrea Mantegna
The Martyrdom of Saint Sebastian (Leonardo), a drawing by Leonardo da Vinci
St. Sebastian (Botticelli), 1474
Martyrdom of Saint Sebastian (Pollaiolo), after 1475
St Sebastian (Antonello da Messina), 1477-79
St Sebastian (Perugino, Nationalmuseum), c. 1490
St Sebastian (Perugino, Louvre), c. 1505
Martyrdom of Saint Sebastian (Signorelli), 1498
The Martyrdom of St Sebastian (Perugino), 1505
St Sebastian (Perugino, São Paulo), c 1505, copy of the last
Saint Sebastian (Titian, Hermitage), 1570-72
Saint Sebastian (El Greco, 1576–1579) or simply Saint Sebastian, 1576–1579
Saint Sebastian (El Greco, 1610–1614), Prado
St Sebastian (Rubens), c. 1614
Saint Sebastian (Reni, Dulwich), Guido Reni, 1620 onwards
Saint Sebastian (Reni, Auckland), Guido Reni, c 1625 
The Martyrdom of Saint Sebastian (Reni), Guido Reni, 1615
Saint Sebastian (Preti), by Mattia Preti, c. 1657
St Sebastian (Bohumil Kubishta painting), 1912

Other depictions
Le Martyre de saint Sébastien, a musical mystery play by Gabriele D'Annunzio, with music by Debussy